Kappalottiya Thamizhan is a 1961 Indian Tamil-language historical drama film produced and directed by B. R. Panthulu. The film stars Sivaji Ganesan, Gemini Ganesan and Savitri. It is based on the 1944 book of the same name by M. P. Sivagnanam, a biography of V. O. Chidambaram Pillai who founded the Swadeshi Stream Navigation Company to break the monopoly of the British over maritime trade out of India.

Kappalottiya Thamizhan was released on 7 November 1961. The film received critical acclaim, and won the National Film Award for Best Feature Film in Tamil at the 9th National Film Awards.

Plot 
V. O. Chidambaram Pillai has devoted himself to the cause of India's freedom from the British Raj. Chidambaram, appearing for the peasant Madasami, wins a case filed by an agent of a British proprietor. Chidambaram's father, who appeared for the agent, sends his son to Thoothukudi lest the British proprietor should give him any trouble. Madasami who accompanies Chidambaram, looks after the latter's salt-pan. At Thoothukudi, Chidambaram meets Subramaniya Siva, a freedom fighter and works for the Swadeshi movement.

Chidambaram receives a complaint from some of the local merchants that the British Shipping Company had refused to load their goods. Against great odds, Chidambaram starts the National Shipping Company with Indian Capital to free Indian trade from dependence on foreign liners. The company prospers despite attempts by the British Company to sabotage the ship of the Indian firm. Chidambaram incurs the displeasure of the Government by organising a strike for getting the grievances of the local coral mill workers redressed and by organising public celebrations to mark the release of Bipin Chandra Pal in contravention of a prohibitory order.

Chidambaram, along with Siva, is invited to Tirunelveli by the District Collector, Winch. The collector directs them not to engage in political activity and also orders them out of the District. They defy the orders and are arrested. In the trial which ensues, Chidambaram is sentenced to 20 years life imprisonment and Siva to 10 years. Chidambaram's sentence is reduced to six years on appeal. The imprisonment of these two leaders sparks off mass unrest which is put down ruthlessly. Some time later, the new District Collector Ashe is shot dead by a patriotic Vanchinathan, who commits suicide before the police can reach him.

The news of the unrelenting struggle outside gives much consolation to Chidambaram and Siva who are treated barbarously in the prison. Chidambaram emerges from the prison a broken man only to witness a series of disappointments – Chidambaram's brother has become insane, Siva is a victim of leprosy contracted during his term in prison, people have forgotten him and his role in the Indian independence movement, the National Shipping Company is bought by its British rival and leaders like Bal Gangadhar Tilak and Bharathiyar die one after another. Chidambaram devotes the last years of his life to the study of literature and dies still dreaming of the day when India would be free.

Cast 

Male cast
 Sivaji Ganesan as V. O. Chidambaram Pillai
 Gemini Ganesan as Madasami
 T. K. Shanmugam as Subramaniya Siva
 S. V. Subbaiah as Bharathiyar
 Balaji as Vanchinathan
 Nagayya as Ulaganathan Pillai
 T. S. Durairaj as Sangan
 Karunanidhi as Mannarsami
 M. N. Kannappa as Meenakshisundaram
 M. R. Santhanam as Aid Ekambaram
 T. N. Sivathanu as Vanchi's father-in-law
 Veerasami as a lawyer
 Eswaran as Neelakanta Brahmachari
 K. V. Srinivasan as Shankara Krishna Iyer
 Parthiban as Judge Pinhe
 Natarajan as Pandit Durai Thevar
 S. A. Kannan as  Vijayaraghavachariar
 Nannu as Fakir Muhammed Seth
 Sayeeram as Sakshi Dharmanayagam Pillai
 Master Thyagarajan as a blind boy

Female cast
 Savithri as Kannamma
 Kumari Rukmani as V. O. C.'s wife, Meenakshi Ammal
 Gemini Chandra as Vanchi's wife, Ponnammal
 T. P. Muthulakshmi as (Sudhandira Devi) Singamma
 S. R. Janaki as Madasami's mother
 Saraswathi as Iyengar's wife
 Sasikala as Bharathiyar's wife, Chellammal
 Radhabhai as Paramayi Ammal
Guest artists
 S. V. Ranga Rao as Winch
 Ashokan as Ashe
 K. Sarangapani as Rayar
 O. A. K. Thevar as Vaduguraman
 Stunt Somu as Sudalai

Supporting cast
 Karikol Raju, Thangaraju, M. S. Karuppaiah, Mani Iyer, Vijayakumar, Kuppusami, V. P. S. Mani, Somanathan, S. A. G. Sami, Harihara Iyer, T. P. Harisingh, Gopraj,V. Mahalingam, Balakrishnan, Natarajan, Raja, Subbaiah, Ramkumar, Ibrahim, Thoothukudi Arunachalam Kuzhavinar, Master Krishna, Seetharaman and Baby Pappi.

Production 
On 14 January 1960, Kappalottiya Thamizhan, a biopic of V. O. Chidambaram Pillai, was announced, to be produced and directed by B. R. Panthulu under Padmini Pictures. The film is based on the 1944 book of the same name by M. P. Sivagnanam, a biography of Chidambaram Pillai. During a time when the DMK was gaining political ground in Tamil Nadu, a time when there was competition between parties, and films were pitched against each other, the opposition unleashed a malicious propaganda that since Chidambaram belonged to the Indian National Congress, Kappalottiya Thamizhan was a film for the Congress. Certain people did not want the masses to be "stirred" by the nationalist spirit.

Sivaji Ganesan was hesitant to do the role of Chidambaram Pillai as he doubted whether he could perform the role flawlessly, but later accepted and studied various material to understand Chidambaram Pillai. S. V. Subbaiah was cast as the poet Subramania Bharati alias Bharathiyar, taking inspiration from his role as Kavi Anandar from the play Kaviyin Kanavu (1945). V. Nagayya who was then in "dire straits", was signed up for a significant role, that of Ulaganathan Pillai, as Panthulu wanted to give him a "break in films".

According to film historian S. Theodore Baskaran, there is no evidence of any research undertaken for making the film. He stated that the film had no props, apart from the character's costumes and the female characters' ear-lobes, which were done to create a "period effect". Though then known for his theatrical-style acting, Ganesan tried acting naturally during the prison sequences and his character's trauma of disillusionment. While primarily in black and white, the film was partly coloured using Gevacolor, and the colour sequences were processed at the Film Centre, Mumbai.

Soundtrack 
The soundtrack of the film was composed by G. Ramanathan. All the songs are based on poems, written by Subramania Bharati.

Release 
Kappalottiya Thamizhan was released on 7 November 1961, and failed commercially, losing ₹7 lakh (worth ₹29 crore in 2021 prices). Tax exemption was offered during its re-release in 1967, making it the first Tamil film to get tax exemption from the government of India. About the film's initial failure, Ganesan felt that since the Congress did not understand artistic sensitivities, Kappalottiya Tamizhan was a  failure. He also stated that he was not upset for losing money making the film to kindle the national spirit, but rather happy that he could harness the medium to remind people of the Indian freedom fighters of the bygone era. At the 9th National Film Awards, Kappalottiya Thamizhan won the National Film Award for Best Feature Film in Tamil.

Reception 
The magazines Kalai and Thendral gave the film positive reviews, saying every Tamilian should see it. Kalki praised Krishnaswamy's writing, and compared the film favourably to Veerapandiya Kattabomman (1959), another biopic also directed by Panthulu and starring Ganesan. On Ganesan's performance, Chidambaram's son Subramaniam said it was like seeing his father alive on the screen, a statement Ganesan considered his "highest award". Following Ganesan's death in 2001, S. Viswanathan of The Frontline praised his performance, saying "Critics list several films as his best in terms of performance. However, according to the actor, his career best was Kappalottiya Thamizhan."

References

Bibliography

External links 
 

1960s biographical drama films
1960s historical drama films
1960s Tamil-language films
1961 drama films
1961 films
Best Tamil Feature Film National Film Award winners
Drama films based on actual events
Epic films based on actual events
Films directed by B. R. Panthulu
Films scored by G. Ramanathan
Films set in 1870
Films set in 1880
Films set in 1890
Films set in 1900
Films set in 1910
Films set in 1920
Films set in 1930
Films set in Tamil Nadu
Films set in the British Raj
Films set in the Indian independence movement
Films set on ships
History of India on film
Indian biographical drama films
Indian films based on actual events
Indian historical drama films
Indian history in popular culture
Sailing films
Works about ships